Aamer Malik (born 3 January 1963, in Mandi Bahauddin, Punjab) is a former Pakistani cricketer who played in 14 Tests and 24 ODIs from 1987 to 1994. In 1987 he took over from Ray Berry as the professional at Hyde CC, playing in the Central Lancashire League.

International centuries

Test centuries

International awards

One-Day International Cricket

Man of the Match awards

References

1963 births
Living people
Pakistan Test cricketers
Pakistan One Day International cricketers
People from Mandi Bahauddin District
Pakistani cricketers
Lahore City A cricketers
Lahore City cricketers
Lahore City Whites cricketers
Pakistan Railways cricketers
Lahore City Blues cricketers
Zarai Taraqiati Bank Limited cricketers
Pakistan International Airlines cricketers
Lahore Whites cricketers